Ivan Dodig won the title, defeating Michael Berrer in the final 6–2, 6–1 .

Seeds

  Nikoloz Basilashvili (second round)
  Illya Marchenko (quarterfinals)
  Ivan Dodig (champion)
  Dudi Sela (semifinals)
  Luca Vanni (quarterfinals)
  Michael Berrer (final)
  Dustin Brown (first round)
  Mirza Basic (first round)

Draw

Finals

Top half

Bottom half

References
 Main Draw
 Qualifying Draw

Internazionali di Tennis Castel del Monte - Singles
2015 Singles
2015 in Italian tennis